Robert E. Howard's Savage Sword was an anthology comic published by Dark Horse Comics showcasing the exploits of Howard's heroes in new adventures and restored reprints of classic tales. All contents were based on or inspired by the works of Robert E. Howard. The series ended with issue number 10.

Publishing history

Issues

Collections

References

2010 comics debuts